Crazy in Love is a 1992 American comedy film directed by Martha Coolidge and written by Gerald Ayres. It is based on the 1988 novel Crazy in Love by Luanne Rice. The film stars Holly Hunter, Gena Rowlands, Bill Pullman, Julian Sands, Herta Ware and Frances McDormand. The film premiered on TNT on August 10, 1992.

Plot

Cast 
Holly Hunter as Georgie Symonds
Gena Rowlands as Honora Swift
Bill Pullman as Nick Symonds
Julian Sands as Mark Constable
Herta Ware as Pem
Frances McDormand as Clare
Joanne Baron as Mona Tuckman
Michael MacRae as John Rice
Kit McDonough as Loretta
Diane Robin as Jean Snizort
Marjorie Nelson as Helen Avery
Krisha Fairchild as Vivien
Peter Lohnes as Donald
Gary Lee Dansenburg as Eugene
Billy O'Sullivan as Casey
George Catalano as Pete Margolis
Alexis Alexander as Mrs. Avery's Secretary

References

External links
 

1992 television films
1992 films
1990s English-language films
American comedy films
1992 comedy films
TNT Network original films
Films directed by Martha Coolidge
Films based on American novels
1990s American films